Psoromella is a genus of lichenized fungi in the family Parmeliaceae. The genus is monotypic, containing the single species Psoromella pampana, found in Argentina.

References

Parmeliaceae
Lichen genera
Monotypic Lecanorales genera
Taxa named by Vilmos Kőfaragó-Gyelnik
Taxa described in 1940